Gaius Julius Solinus was a Latin grammarian, geographer, and compiler who probably flourished in the early 3rd century AD. Historical scholar Theodor Mommsen dates him to the middle of the 3rd century.

Solinus was the author of De mirabilibus mundi ("The wonders of the world") which circulated
both under the title Collectanea rerum memorabilium ("Collection of Curiosities"), and Polyhistor, though the latter title was favoured by the author himself. The work is indeed a description of curiosities in a chorographic framework. Adventus, to whom it is dedicated, is identified with Oclatinius Adventus, Roman consul in AD 218. It contains a short description of the ancient world, with remarks on historical, social, religious, and natural history questions. The greater part is taken from Pliny's Natural History and the geography of Pomponius Mela.

According to Mommsen, Solinus also relied upon a chronicle (possibly by Cornelius Bocchus) and a Chorographia pliniana, an epitome of Pliny's work with additions made about the time of Hadrian. Schanz, however, suggests the Roma and Prata of Suetonius.

A greatly revised version of his original text was made, perhaps by Solinus himself. This version contains a letter that Solinus wrote as an introduction to the work, which gives the work the title Polyhistor ("multi-descriptive"). Both versions of the work circulated widely and eventually Polyhistor was taken for the author's name. It was popular in the Middle Ages, hexameter abridgments being current under the names of Theodericus and Petrus Diaconus.

The commentary by Saumaise in his Plinianae exercitationes (1689) was considered indispensable; the 1895 edition by Mommsen includes a valuable introduction on the manuscripts, the authorities used by Solinus, and subsequent compilers. See also Teuffel, Hist. of Roman Literature (Eng. trans., 1900), 389; and Schanz, Geschichte der römischen Litteratur (1904), iv. I. There is an early modern English translation by Arthur Golding (1587) and a modern one with commentary by Dr. Arwen Apps of Macquarie University.

References

Text and Translation
Kai Brodersen, Solinus: Wunder der Welt. Collectanea rerum mirabilium. Lateinisch und Deutsch. Edition Antike. Darmstadt: Wiss. Buchgesellschaft 2014. 
Arwen Elizabeth Apps, Gaius Iulius Solinus and His Polyhistor, Macquarie University, 2011 (PhD Dissertation)

Sources and Studies
Hermann Walter, Die ‘Collectanea rerum memorabilium’ des C. Julius Solinus. Ihre Entstehung und die Echtheit ihrer Zweitfassung, Wiesbaden, 1969 (Hermes. Einzelschriften, 22).
Kai Brodersen (ed.), Solinus. New Studies. Heidelberg: Verlag Antike 2014.

External links

Gaius Julius Solinus, the Polyhistor, English translation by Arwen Apps (in ToposText.org, from her PhD diss., Macquarie University, 2011)
Ivlii Solini de sitv et memorabilibvs orbis capitvla, Editio princeps, Venice 1473, at the Bavarian State Library
Gaii Iulii Solini de Mirabilibus Mundi at The Latin Library, Latin texts of both the C.L.F. Panckoucke edition (Paris 1847) and the Mommsen edition (1864).
Online Galleries, History of Science Collections, University of Oklahoma Libraries High resolution images of works by Solinus in .jpg and .tiff format.
The excellent and pleasant worke of Iulius Solinus Polyhistor Contayning the noble actions of humaine creatures, the secretes & prouidence of nature, the description of countries, the maners of the people: with many meruailous things and strange antiquities, seruing for the benefitt and recreation of all sorts of persons. Translated out of Latin into English, by Arthur Golding. Gent.

3rd-century Romans
3rd-century Latin writers
solinus
Geographers
Solinus, Gaius
Post–Silver Age Latin writers
Roman-era geographers
3rd-century geographers